Vemana, popularly known as Yogi Vemana, was an Indian philosopher and poet in the Telugu language. His poems are known for their use of simple language and native idioms. They discuss the subjects of yoga, wisdom and morality.

Early life and background 
There is no consensus among scholars about the period in which Vemana lived. C.P. Brown, known for his research on Vemana, estimates his year of birth to be 1652 based on some of his verses. Various sources say he was born in the fifteenth, sixteenth, seventeenth centuries and eighteenth centuries 
Vemana was a Vedic scholar and a great yogi in achala sidhantha.

Vemana was born in Gandikota, Kadapa district in Andhra Pradesh.

Death 
There is a headstone marking the grave of Yogi Vemana in Katarupalli (Kadiri town), a village in Kadiri taluk, Anantapur district, Andhra Pradesh. It is widely believed that Vemana died in this village. Owing to the fact that he was a yogi, he was buried and not cremated.

Poetic style 
Many lines of Yogi Vemana's poems are now colloquial phrases of the Telugu language. They end with the signature line Viswadaabhi Raama Vinura Vema, literally "Beloved of Viswada, listen Vema." There are multiple interpretations of what the last line signifies.

Vemana's poems were collected and published by Brown in the 19th century. His poems follow various themes: social, moral, satirical and mystical. Most of them are in Ataveladi (dancing lady) meter.

Films
 Yogi Vemana, a 1947 Telugu film directed by K. V. Reddy, starring V. Nagayya.
 Sri Vemana Charitra, another Telugu film, released in 1986 and directed by C. S. Rao, starring Vijayachander.

References

External links
 [Dr. Sridhar Rapelli, New York]
 Vemana Yogi - Varna Vyavastha, Dr. Sridhar Rapelli, Commentator- 2002
 Verses of Vemana - English Translation by C.P.Brown
 The story of Vemana told by Sadhguru Jaggi Vasudev.

Telugu people
Telugu poets
Year of birth uncertain
Year of death uncertain
People from Rayalaseema
Indian male poets
Poets from Andhra Pradesh
Vijayanagara poets